Northwest Executive Education (Previously known as Northwest College for Advanced Learning) provides Executive Education in Leadership and Management in collaboration with universities like University of California, Los Angeles, University of California, Berkeley, University of London International Programmes and IE Business School, Madrid. Northwest is based out of India with locations in New Delhi, Mumbai and Bangalore. Mohit and Tamhant are Harvard Business School graduates and co-founders of Northwest.

References

External links 
UC Berkeley Executive Program in Management Launched in India
PG Programme for executives (UCLA PGPX).
Seven successful enterprises by IIT graduates.
IE Business School launches cross continent program in India

Non-profit organisations based in India
Educational organisations based in India
Training organizations